Kacey Louisa Barnfield (born 14 January 1988), also credited as Kacey Clarke, is an English actress. As a teenager she played Maddie Gilks in the long running British television series Grange Hill, on which she was in six series. As an adult, her roles have included Crystal in the American action film Resident Evil: Afterlife, and Katie Sutherland in British comedy The Inbetweeners. In 2014, Clarke was listed as number 99 in FHMs 100 sexiest women in the world.

Personal life
Clarke was born in the London Borough of Enfield as Kacey Louisa Barnfield to parents Malcolm, a partner at the Enfield estate agency Barnfield's, and Karen. She has a brother and a sister. Clarke is a second cousin of the actress Victoria Shalet. Clarke splits her time between London and Los Angeles, maintaining a base in both cities.

Career
Barnfield began acting in 1997 at age nine. In 2000, Barnfield won the role of bully Maddie Gilks in Grange Hill, where she found herself the central role in central plots during her four-years on the series; it was Clarke's first major acting role.

After Grange Hill, Clarke filmed Popcorn with Jodi Albert and Jack Ryder, and plays the character of Yukino. She has also appeared in the Sky1 football drama Dream Team. Other roles include Zoe Stringer in Filthy Rich, in which she played Mike Reid's daughter shortly before he died, The Bill, where she played Chloe Fox for 3 episodes in 2004 and appeared again in October 2007 as Kelly Burgess, and Casualty in which she appeared as Claudie Waters for 2 episodes on 29 and 30 December 2007. In 2008, Clarke was the face of Clean & Clear, appearing in adverts for the skincare brand. She also starred in the Road Safety commercial 'Mess'. In 2008 she became Galaxy chocolate's 'Miss Kiss' to publicize their Christmas Mistletoe Kisses chocolates. In 2009 and 2010, she appeared in the E4 sitcom The Inbetweeners, as Neil's sister Katie in the series 2 episode "A Night Out in London" and series 3's "Will's Dilemma".

Clarke made her theatrical film debut as Crystal Waters in the Screen Gem's 3D action film Resident Evil: Afterlife, alongside Milla Jovovich, Wentworth Miller and Ali Larter. It topped the box office in September 2010. Clarke also starred in the TV movie Lake Placid 3, where she plays Ellie, this was also in 2010. In 2011, she played the lead role of Kate in Johannes Roberts' Roadkill, a horror film about a group of teens taking an ill-fated RV trip around Ireland. Her performance was well received. Clarke appeared as Barb in Jeremy Leven's 2013 movie Girl on a Bicycle.

In June 2011, Variety magazine reported that Clarke would co-star in Glutton, a '3D psychological thriller' directed by David Arquette, playing Virginia the blind neighbour and only friend of a 1,200-pound man (Abraham Benrubi). Abraham Benrubi, and Patricia Arquette also star. Glutton was to begin filming in Canada in summer 2011, though no film under that title has been released.

Filmography

References

External links

1988 births
English film actresses
English television actresses
Living people
People from Enfield, London
People from the London Borough of Hackney
Actresses from London
English expatriates in the United States
21st-century English actresses
English child actresses
British child actresses
20th-century English actresses